Alpiscorpius is a genus of scorpions in the family Euscorpiidae that was first described by Benjamin Gantenbein, Victor Fet, Carlo Largiader & Adolf Scholl in 1999.

Species 
Alpiscorpius contains the following twenty species:

 Alpiscorpius alpha (Caporiaco, 1950)
 Alpiscorpius beta (Di Caporiacco, 1950)
 Alpiscorpius caporiaccoi (Bonacina, 1980)
 Alpiscorpius croaticus (Di Caporiacco, 1950)
 Alpiscorpius delta Kovarik, Stundlova, Fet & Stahlavsky, 2019
 Alpiscorpius dinaricus (Di Caporiacco, 1950)
 Alpiscorpius gamma (Caporiaco, 1950)
 Alpiscorpius germanus (C.L. Koch, 1837)
 Alpiscorpius kappa Kovarik, Stundlova, Fet & Stahlavsky, 2019
 Alpiscorpius karamani Tropea, 2021
 Alpiscorpius lambda Kovarik, Stundlova, Fet & Stahlavsky, 2019
 Alpiscorpius liburnicus Podnar et al., 2022
 Alpiscorpius mingrelicus (Kessler, 1874)
 Alpiscorpius omega Kovarik, Stundlova, Fet & Stahlavsky, 2019
 Alpiscorpius omikron Kovarik, Stundlova, Fet & Stahlavsky, 2019
 Alpiscorpius pavicevici Tropea, 2021
 Alpiscorpius phrygius (Bonacina, 1980)
 Alpiscorpius sigma Kovarik, Stundlova, Fet & Stahlavsky, 2019
 Alpiscorpius uludagensis (Lacroix, 1995)
 Alpiscorpius ypsilon Kovarik, Stundlova, Fet & Stahlavsky, 2019
 Alpiscorpius zloporubovici Tropea, 2021

References 

Euscorpiidae
Scorpion genera